Ruth Tomalin (1919, Piltown, County Kilkenny, Ireland – 22 November 2012, Eastbourne) was a British journalist, novelist, and children's author.

Biography
Ruth Tomalin grew up in West Sussex on the Stansted Park estate, where her father was head gardener. She was educated at Chichester High School, Sussex, and then at King's College London, where she received her diploma of journalism in 1939. She served from 1941 to 1942 at Bosham in the Women's Land Army. From 1942 to 1961 she was a reporter for newspapers in Hampshire, Sussex, Dorset, and Hertfordshire. From 1961 she was a part-time court reporter in London.

In 1942, she married Vernon Leaver. They had one son but the marriage ended in divorce. In 1971, she married William N. Ross, who predeceased her.

Selected publications

 (verse)
as Ruth Leaver:  (for children)
 (novel)
 (verse)
as Ruth Leaver:  (for children)
 (for children)
 (for children)
 (novel)
 (novel)

 (novel)
 (for children)
 (for children)
 (for children)
 (Francie book series, 1 of 2)

 (Francie book series, 2 of 2)

References

1919 births
2012 deaths
Alumni of King's College London
British children's writers
British women novelists
20th-century British novelists
20th-century British women writers
People from Stoughton, West Sussex